Qanat Bid-e Yek (also Romanized as Qanāt Bīd-e Yek; also known as Kahn Bīd Sar and Qanāt Bīd) is a village in Sarduiyeh Rural District, Sarduiyeh District, Jiroft County, Kerman Province, Iran. At the 2006 census, its population was 30, in 8 families.

References 

Populated places in Jiroft County